Vijeta (English: Winner) is a 1996 Bollywood action crime thriller film directed by K. Murali Mohana Rao and produced by Shree Ganesh Productions. Sanjay Dutt and Raveena Tandon played the lead roles with Paresh Rawal, Amrish Puri and Reema Lagoo in supporting characters. It was a remake of Telugu film Sathruvu (1990).

Plot
Advocate Durga Prasad was to have received a file from Chote Thakur with regard to a case pending in a Court in Bangalore, India. However, Chote gets killed, he does not receive the file, and the Court's decision goes against him. Then he is approached by a former Government Employee, an Inquiry Officer, who claims that he was wrongly dismissed and framed by corrupt Government Officials. Durga Prasad, along with his juniors, Ashok, Ravi, and one other, decide to handle his case, however, before even the case could be filed, the Inquiry Officer is killed. An angered Durga is determined to take this matter to Court, but before that could happen, he and his wife, Laxmi, are killed in broad daylight right outside the Courthouse. His Junior, Ashok, promises to avenge their killings and sets about to locate their killers. He finds out that all of them work for Vidhya Sagar, and he goes about killing them one by one. Then the DIG of Police, Jagdish Chaudhary, assigns Police Inspector Vijayalaxmi to apprehend Ashok, not knowing that Vijaya and Ashok are in love with each other. She questions Ashok, but he provides her an alibi for each and every occurrence. But when the Mayor of Bangalore is killed, she catches Ashok red-handed, leaving open the question of whether Ashok will be ready to provide an alibi for this death or merely claim that he did not do it. The question remains, if Ashok did not kill the Mayor, then who did?

Cast

 Sanjay Dutt - Advocate Ashok
 Raveena Tandon - Inspector Madam Anti Vijayalaxmi
 Paresh Rawal - Vidhya Sagar
 Reema Lagoo - Mrs. Laxmi D. Prasad
 Amrish Puri - D.I.G. Jagdish Chaudhary
 Alok Nath - Advocate Durga Prasad
 Annu Kapoor - Constable Chamanlal
 Rakesh Bedi - Constable Madanlal
 Dinesh Hingoo - Politics
 Dinesh Kaushik-
 Raju Shrestha-
 Deep Dhillon - Satyamurti, football coach
 Ananth Narayan Mahadevan - Inquiry Officer
 Shiva Rindani - Pratap Sharma
 Viju Khote - Vidhya Sagar's Lawyer
 Mahesh Anand - George
 Mac Mohan- Fernandes 
 Javed Haider as Chintu 
 Achyut Potdar- Chintu's Grandfather
Ajit Vachani as Thapar
Arun Bakshi as Trade Union Leader
Asrani as Lallan, landLord's Wife
Guddi Maruti as Rani, Lallan's Wife

Soundtrack
"Ghunghat Mein Mukhde Ko" - Udit Narayan, Alka Yagnik
"Ghunghat Mein Mukhde Ko v2" - Bela Sulakhe
"Khwabo Mein Aanewali" - Vinod Rathod, Alka Yagnik
"Mujhko Ek Pappi Chahiye" - Abhijeet, Poornima
"Neend Aati Nahin" - Abhijeet, Poornima
"Sherie Main Ho Gaya Deewana" - Abhijeet, Kavita Krishnamurthy

References

External links
 

1996 films
1990s Hindi-language films
1996 action films
Hindi remakes of Telugu films
Films scored by Anand–Milind
Indian action films
Hindi-language action films
Indian crime action films